In Finnish folklore, all places and things, and also human beings, have a haltija (a genius, guardian spirit) of their own.  One such haltija is called etiäinen—an image, doppelgänger, or just an impression that goes ahead of a person, doing things the person in question later does. For example, people waiting at home might hear the door close or even see a shadow or a silhouette, only to realize that no one has yet arrived. Etiäinen can also refer to some kind of a feeling that something is going to happen. Sometimes it could, for example, warn of a bad year coming.

In modern Finnish, the term has detached from its shamanistic origins and refers to premonition. Unlike clairvoyance, divination, and similar practices, etiäiset (plural) are spontaneous and can't be induced. Quite the opposite, they may be unwanted and cause anxiety, like ghosts. Etiäiset need not be too dramatic and may concern everyday events, although ones related to e.g. deaths are common. As these phenomena are still reported today, they can be considered a living tradition, as a way to explain the psychological experience of premonition.

Possible causes 
One explanation given for the detail of the apparition is that when a person is waiting for someone, their anticipation can augment everyday sounds, for example of a cat or the wind, and bring to consciousness a vivid recollection of the person. This recollection will tend to produce the feeling that the remembered person is "coming". If no one comes, the "possible etiäinen" is forgotten. The failure of this explanation is that etiäinen is not necessary when you expect someone to come. It more often indicates an unexpected visitor who would otherwise come as a surprise without phone calls or any kind of announcement beforehand.

See also
Bilocation
Fæcce
Vardøger, a similar belief in Norway

References

Finnish legendary creatures
Counterparts